Peter Chris Rasmusen (born 30 October 1980) is an American-Greek former baseball player who competed in the 2004 Summer Olympics. He played one minor league season for the High Desert Mavericks, the High-A affiliate of the Milwaukee Brewers at the time. He was an All-American at Triton College in 1999-2000. He hit the game winning home run for Stetson University in their upset of #3 ranked Georgia Tech in the Atlanta Regional of the College World Series in 2003.

Pete is now a North Central Region CrossFit Games athlete for Team CrossFit Carbon. He also owns a CrossFit Carbon in Vernon Hills, Illinois where he coaches as well.

References

1980 births
Living people
Greek baseball players
Olympic baseball players of Greece
Baseball players at the 2004 Summer Olympics
CrossFit athletes
Lincoln Saltdogs players
High Desert Mavericks players
Triton Trojans baseball players
Baseball players from Illinois
Sportspeople from Elgin, Illinois